Puk or PUK may refer to: 

 Patriotic Union of Kurdistan (PUK), an Iraqi-Kurdish political party in Iraqi Kurdistan;
 PIN unlock key, code for resetting the personal identification number on mobile devices;
 Buk (puk), a traditional Korean drum.
 A. J. Puk, American baseball player